Dream Express is FLOW's second single. It reached #9 on the Oricon charts in its first week and charted for 9 weeks. *

Track listing

References

2003 singles
Flow (band) songs
2003 songs
Ki/oon Music singles